Captain Beany (born Barry Kirk on 23 September 1954) is a Welsh eccentric and charity fundraiser in Sandfields, Port Talbot, South Wales.

Biography
Kirk worked in the computer department of the British Petroleum chemical plant in Baglan, Neath Port Talbot. In May 1991, he changed his name by deed poll to Captain Beany. He began painting his face and bald head orange, donned a golden cape, pants, gloves and boots. To date, Captain Beany claims to have raised over £100,000 for charity through participation in various events, such as the London and New York Marathons.

In 1986 Beany set a world record for the longest time sitting in a bath full of baked beans, which lasted over 100 hours.

In 2006, Beany appeared on the BBC programme, Let Me Entertain You.

In September 2008, Beany climbed Snowdon carrying baked beans in aid of cancer research. Later, in October, during the 2000s financial crisis, he registered the trademark "Credit Crunch" for use on chocolate bars. When Selfridges sold a similarly named product, Captain Beany earned a percentage of the sales under a licensing agreement.

In 2015 Beany raised £3,600 for charity by having 60 baked bean images tattooed on his head. Those sponsoring him had their initials inked inside one of the baked beans.

In 2018 Beany appeared on a Christmas special of Blind Date as one of the choices. He wasn't chosen.

In 2022, Captain Beany appeared on Inside the Superbrands.

Eccentric of the year
In April 2009, Beany was awarded the title of "Great British Eccentric of the Year" by the Eccentric Club in London. He also officially transformed his council flat into the Baked Bean Museum of Excellence, with British writer Danny Wallace presiding over the opening ceremony.

In December 2009, he teamed up with other Port Talbot musicians to record a charity Christmas song. He completed the Sports Relief Mile 2010 whilst pushing a tin of baked beans on his hands and knees.

The Baked Bean Museum of Excellence in Port Talbot was featured in the 2010 book Behind The Scenes at the Museum of Baked Beans by author Hunter Davies.

He also planned to walk nearly 460 miles around the borders of Wales and England for the Cieran Jones Appeal whilst conveying a plate of baked beans on toast. His planned 'BEANS ON TOAST-A-THON' was to take place in mid August 2010.

Political career
He has also been a candidate in local and general elections throughout Wales. He stood as "Captain Beany of the Bean Party" in the 1991 Neath by-election, coming last with 262 votes (0.7%). He then stood as the "Real Bean" candidate in Aberavon in 1992, again coming last with 707 votes (1.8%). In 1997, he stood in Aberavon again, this time as an Independent, and came last again with 341 votes (1.0%).

In 2000, he formed the New Millennium Bean Party, of which he was the sole member. On this line in Aberavon in the 2001 election, he came sixth out of seven candidates with 727 votes (2.4%). In the 2005 general election, Beany gained 159 votes in Cardiff Central.

He contested Aberavon again in the 2010 general election, receiving 558 votes (1.8%), placing seventh out of eight candidates. In the 2015 general election, support for Captain Beany more than doubled, to 1,137 votes (3.6%), good enough for sixth out of nine candidates.

References

External links

1954 births
Living people
Charity fundraisers (people)
Welsh politicians
British political candidates
People from Port Talbot